The 2005 CPL World Tour was a year-long gaming competition held by the Cyberathlete Professional League (CPL). This competition took place throughout 2005, with a total of nine international stops and a finals event held in the New York City, United States and televised by MTV.

The total purse was US$1,000,000, with $50,000 at each international stop, and a $500,000 final. The official game of the 2005 World Tour was Painkiller. The CPL's "strategic partners", organizations designated to operate regional World Tour stops, also chose to hold smaller tournaments for other popular competitive games, such as Counter-Strike.

The World Tour Grand Finals took place between November 20 and 22 2005 and were hosted in New York City, New York, United States. The Finals hosted the top 32 Painkiller winners from all stops around the globe. They pitted in a one versus one tournament for the largest first place prize in the CPL's history: US$150,000. The total prize fund for the finals tournament was $500,000, the largest ever for a Painkiller tournament.

The champion of the 2005 CPL World Tour was Johnathan 'Fatal1ty' Wendel, who took the grand prize of $150,000. Sander "Vo0" Kaasjager was named the MVP of the tour, an award worth $20,000, and took $100,000 for becoming the runner-up in the finals. By this, Wendel took his fourth CPL World Championship, taking the crown back from Kaasjager, who had taken it from him a year earlier.

Painkiller Results

Tour Stops

Turkey 
 Location: Istanbul, Turkey
 Date: March 25–March 27, 2005
 Champion: Sander "Vo0" Kaasjager
 Strategic Partner: E-Sportr

Spain 
 Location: Barcelona, Spain
 Date: April 29–May 1, 2005
 Champion: Stephan "SteLam" Lammert
 Strategic Partner: E-Life Europe

Brazil 
 Location: Rio de Janeiro, Brazil
 Date: May 27–May 30, 2005
 Champion: Sander "Vo0" Kaasjager
 Strategic Partner: Marketing Cell

Sweden 
 Location: Jönköping, Sweden
 Date: June 16–June 19, 2005
 Champion: Sander "Vo0" Kaasjager
 Strategic Partner: E-Sport Entertainment Group

United States 
 Location: Dallas, Texas, United States
 Date: July 6–July 10, 2005
 Champion: Johnathan 'Fatal1ty' Wendel

Germany 
 Location: Berlin, Germany
 Date: Cancelled
 This stop was cancelled due to "critical logistical challenges", this stop was replaced by the Italy stop.

United Kingdom 
 Location: Sheffield, UK
 Date: September 2–September 4, 2005
 Champion: Sander "Vo0" Kaasjager
 Strategic Partner: Gamefrontier

China 
 Location: Beijing, China
 Date: Cancelled
 This stop was also cancelled due to the Chinese Ministry of Culture (China)'s ban on Painkiller in China. A replacement stop was held in Singapore.

Singapore 
 Location: Singapore, Singapore
 Date: October 14–October 16, 2005
 Champion: Johnathan 'Fatal1ty' Wendel
 Strategic Partner: Edge of Reality

Italy 
 Location: Milan, Italy
 Date: October 20–October 23, 2005
 Champion: Sander "Vo0" Kaasjager
 Strategic Partner: smau

Chile 
 Location: Santiago, Chile
 Date: October 28–October 30, 2005
 Champion: Alexander "Ztrider" Ingarv
 Strategic Partner: LAN-Z.net

References 

2005 in esports
Cyberathlete Professional League